Heisig is a German surname. Notable people with the surname include:

James Heisig (born 1944), American philosopher
Johannes Heisig (born 1953), German artist
Mary Heisig (1913–1966), American artist

See also
Walther Heissig (1913–2005), Austrian Mongolist

German-language surnames